The Centre Vinicole – Champagne Nicolas Feuillatte (CV-CNF) is the oldest union of producers of champagne. It comprises 82 winemaking cooperatives representing more than 5000 vineyards, situated on a hill in the commune of Chouilly, on the road leading to Pierry, and overlooks the community of Épernay. In 2017, Nicolas Feuillatte named Four Seasons employee, Craig M. Joseph, as their new chief Operating Officer.

History 

Henri Macquart founded the Centre Vinicole de la Champagne in 1972 as a storage and vinification unit to serve winegrowers, federated around cooperative or individual wine presses, and it got its present name in 1986.

Nicolas Feuillatte created his brand in 1976, after inheriting a vineyard near Reims, the Domaine de Bouleuse. In 1986 it was purchased by the Centre Vinicole de la Champagne. Centre Vinicole produces about 24 million bottles of champagne a year.

Source of supply 

 82 cooperatives out of the 140 in Champagne bringing together 4,500 winegrowers (56% of the supply).
 Union of Individual Producers: 1,000 individual wine-growers (44% of the supply).

See also
 List of Champagne houses

References

External links
 Official Website : CV - Champagne Nicolas Feuillatte 

Feuillatte